Saippuaprinssi ("Soap Prince") is a 2006 Finnish romantic comedy film directed by Janne Kuusi starring Mikko Leppilampi and Pamela Tola. Aleksi Bardy wrote the script.

Cast
Pamela Tola ....  Ilona
Mikko Leppilampi ....  Kalle/Antero
Outi Mäenpää ....  Raakel
Teijo Eloranta ....  Tape Recorder
Kristiina Halttu ....  Reija/Seija (as Kristina Halttu)
Sari Havas ....  Writer
Jarmo Hyttinen ....  Angel (as Jami Hyttinen)
Julia Jokinen ....  Script girl
Risto Kaskilahti ....  Mixer
Tommi Korpela ....  Assistant director
Jani Volanen ....  Director
Anu Koskinen ....  Receptionist
Jukka-Pekka Palo ....  Kalela, head of TV-channel
Juha Veijonen .... Actor Laaksonen
Pete Lattu .... Amateur actor Leo
Anna Paavilainen .... Ilona's roommate Jonna
Pihla Penttinen .... Amateur theatre director Tiina
Minttu Mustakallio .... Script editor Eeva
Janne Reinikainen .... Script editor Vesa
Zarkus Poussa .... Sound effect man

External links

Finnish romantic comedy films
2006 romantic comedy films
2006 films
2000s Finnish-language films